The Beast is a wooden roller coaster located at Kings Island amusement park in Mason, Ohio. Designed and manufactured in-house for approximately $3 million, the ride opened in 1979 as the tallest, fastest, and longest wooden roller coaster in the world. Two lift hills contribute to the ride's duration of more than four minutes, which also ranks as one of the longest among roller coasters.

The Beast was designed over the course of two years without assistance from scientific calculators and computers. Lead engineers Al Collins and Jeff Gramke consulted with well-known coaster architect , who shared design formulas and strategies to assist during development. Issues discovered during early testing delayed plans to build an enclosure over the helix finale until 1980. Ruth Voss, the park's public relations manager who would often overhear construction crews calling it "a beast of a project", is credited with coming up with the ride's name in early 1979.

The record-breaking coaster was well-received at a press event preview held on April 13, 1979. Since its opening, The Beast has consistently ranked in the top ten among wooden coasters in the annual Golden Ticket Awards publication from Amusement Today. It has also earned a favorable reputation across the industry, including praise from American Coaster Enthusiasts (ACE), which held one of its first official events at Kings Island in 1979. ACE awarded the ride its Roller Coaster Landmark designation in 2004. After more than 40 years, it also remains one of the most popular rides at Kings Island, having accommodated over 54 million riders.

History 
Ruth Voss, public relations manager for Kings Island, issued a press release on July 10, 1978, announcing plans for a new roller coaster. The statement read, "Kings Island Family Entertainment Center will open America’s champion roller coaster in the spring of 1979." It was the first official announcement from the park, who had been secretly planning the new ride for three years. Looking to replicate the national exposure received from popular rides such as The Racer and record-breaking events including Evel Knievel's nationally televised bus jump in 1975, Kings Island sought to keep the momentum going by introducing another record-breaking attraction.

Original plans focused on building a replica of the iconic Shooting Star, a popular roller coaster which once stood at Coney Island in Cincinnati. Charles Dinn – director of the Kings Island's construction, maintenance and engineering division – had recorded measurements of the Shooting Star's layout and dimensions prior to its demolition in 1971. The park later selected an area near The Racer where the replica would be built. Management eventually determined it was in their best interest to shelve the idea and instead push forward with a bigger design. The Shooting Star would later be resurrected in the layout design of Mighty Canadian Minebuster at Canada's Wonderland, which opened in 1981. For the 1979 coaster, Kings Island set its sights on an attraction that would transcend the Shooting Star's nostalgia and appeal to a wider audience.

Design and construction
A wooded area in the southeast corner of the park spanning  was selected as the site for the new project. The area's naturally-occurring, rugged terrain consisted of cliffs, hills and ravines. Utilizing the landscape as opposed to leveling it saved money and allowed for more investment in the layout itself. Beginning in 1976, chief engineer and surveyor Al Collins and his assistant Jeff Gramke spent two years researching and designing the new roller coaster with the help of Dinn and his team, who surveyed major roller coasters across the country. Collins and Gramke would progress through tens of thousands of formulas needed to produce record-breaking results without the assistance of scientific calculators or computers. "Everything had to be calculated by hand", recalled Gramke in 2014. John C. Allen, world-renowned coaster designer behind The Racer, was asked to lead the design but declined due to pending retirement. He shared design formulas, however, and acted as a consultant throughout development. Among his important contributions were the design of several components, including a tire-driven launch system that increased capacity above 1,000 riders per hour.

The original plans for the Beast featured an airtime hill after the first tunnel followed by a left turn and a double down. After the second lift hill, passengers would approach a trick track element and a right-handed double helix. This helix is a mirror image of the one that is used today.

Primary design and construction was handled internally by Kings Island Engineering and Construction under the direction of Dinn. Part of the design work was subcontracted to Curtis D. Summers, Inc., a structural engineering and architecture firm located in Cincinnati. Summers was tasked with designing the roller coaster footings – underground, steel-reinforced concrete pillars that support the weight of the structure – as well as a cable system for the coaster's helix finale. The collaboration between Dinn and Summers would later lead to the pair teaming up and forming the Dinn Corporation, a construction firm that designed and built eleven coasters in the late 1980s and early 1990s.

The initial land grading prep work began in May 1978. The coaster's vertical construction officially began the following month on June 10. By November 9, 1978, approximately 60 percent of the ride was complete, which included both of the ride's lift hills and its three tunnels. The remaining construction work was completed by March 1979.

Its three underground tunnels were designed by Jim Kiosky, with one at the base of the first drop and two more approximately a third of the way into the track layout. The trains were manufactured by Philadelphia Toboggan Coasters, Allen's employer, who also implemented their "buzz bar" restraints. An early iteration of the train's design was based on the traditional mine car concept, which employed headlamps at the front of each train. Late changes scrapped the mine car theme in favor of a flame-colored paint scheme, and a sculpted logo was attached at the front in place of the headlamps. The logo, created by national advertising firm Lawler Ballard Little, would receive an award from The Advertising Club of New York later that year.

Early testing revealed issues in the design of the final helix track element. The amount of side acceleration the trains experienced was more than the design intended, so the entire helix was reconstructed with a wider diameter. The delay forced Kings Island to forego the enclosing of the helix, which would eventually happen the following off-season. Also at the first tunnel's exit, it was discovered that additional banking was needed to reduce stress on the structure. Engineers managed to complete the feat overnight, considering most of the coaster's track was relatively close to the ground and large cranes were not needed. In the late 1970s, engineers didn't have the benefit of computerized devices that could measure force, and they didn't use test dummies which are common in modern-day construction. Instead, crew members of The Beast's construction team had to board the ride for test runs and push the train back to the station whenever it stalled.

Opening and early modifications
Several months before its scheduled opening as construction was nearing completion, the attraction was still without a name. Voss often overheard construction crews referring to the project as "a monster" or calling it "a beast of a project". She pitched the idea of naming it "The Beast" to executives who unanimously agreed. To promote the new ride, an animated commercial was released, along with a number of radio contests that granted winners the opportunity to be among the first to ride. After more than three years of planning, design, and construction, The Beast opened to the public on April 14, 1979, the first day of Kings Island's 1979 operating season. At the time, The Beast was the tallest, fastest, and longest wooden roller coaster in the world.

Within a few years of the ride's opening, the layout of the original trains were modified. They originally consisted of five cars with four rows each, but engineers determined early on that the longer cars weren't allowing proper navigation along the track. The configuration was changed to six cars with three rows each, reducing the length of the train and number of riders from 40 to 36. The ride also originally featured three underground tunnels, but the second and third were joined together by the second season of operation. The previously-unfinished double helix was also enclosed in time for the second season, resulting in two separate tunnels.

2000–present
Kings Island unveiled Son of Beast in 2000, marketed as a "sequel" to The Beast, located in another area of the park. It became the tallest and fastest wooden roller coaster in the world, as well as the first modern-day wooden coaster to feature an inversion. Although Son of Beast set several new records, The Beast retained its wooden coaster records for length and ride duration. Son of Beast was demolished in 2012 following a series of incidents that halted operation in 2009. In 2019, to commemorate the 40th anniversary of the ride, each of the three trains were restored to their original "flame-themed" paint scheme, and the painted paw prints that lead up to the ride's entrance were restored.

Two of the ride's signature elements were reprofiled to provide a smoother ride.

Ride experience

Queue
After entering through the main entrance, guests proceed down a walkway that winds left. One or two smaller queue areas may be active depending on the number of guests waiting to ride. Eventually, the path leads up a ramp, in which signs are on display containing historical facts about The Beast, and into the station, which resembles an old mining facility. Warning signs to secure loose articles are on display, along with promotional material with ominous warnings about the upcoming Beast encounter. Guests proceed through one last sub-queue within the station before boarding.

Layout
The ride begins with the train making a 180-degree turn out of the station, traveling through a switch track, which provides the option of diverting trains to a covered storage area. A small mineshaft can be seen on the right side. Riders take a slight left turn and slowly climb  up the first lift hill. Dramatic music can be heard on the speaker as an announcer tells guests to remain seated throughout the entire ride. After cresting the top, the train plunges  at a 53-degree angle, entering a  underground tunnel and passing an on-ride camera. The train exits the first drop still making its way out of the tunnel, which is followed by a sharp left turn into a  airtime hill with a  drop at a 32-degree angle. The train then climbs upward, makes a right turn, and speeds into a covered brake shed. Once through the magnetic trim brakes, the track turns to the right and continues through a heavily wooded area. A quarter of this tunnel is underground, while the exit is above ground in relation to the topography of the land. As it exits the tunnel, the train gains speed veering right, then takes another hard turn to the right on a slight incline.

At the top of this lift, the train turns left and begins a gradual, 18.5-degree drop. During the descent, the track tilts to the left in preparation for the upcoming double helix that features a highly banked turn to the left. The drop itself measures  from the crest of the lift hill to the lowest point of the helix. The signature double helix features two long tunnels and turns riders counterclockwise twice at very high speeds while ascending. After exiting this element, the train dips through another small hill into the final magnetic brake run and returns to the station.

Records
When it opened in 1979, The Beast set several world records among roller coasters including height, speed, and track length. The Beast is also known to have one of the longest ride times at 4 minutes and 10 seconds.

The Beast has held world records for the following:
 Longest drop on a wooden roller coaster at 
 Fastest wooden roller coaster at 
 Longest track length on a wooden roller coaster at

Awards and rankings
When The Beast opened, it was well received. American Coaster Enthusiasts (ACE) held one of its first official events at Kings Island in 1979, and its members ranked The Beast as the "most outstanding thrill ride" in 1981. Additionally, in 1988, Roller Coaster magazine ranked the coaster second on its list of the top ten rides. In 2004, the ACE designated The Beast as a Roller Coaster Landmark by the American Coaster Enthusiasts, an organization that  There is a plaque commemorating the achievement located near the main entrance to the ride.

Notes

References

External links

Kings Island official site - The Beast
The Beast - CoasterGallery.com
P.O.V. Video of The Beast
Kings Island Central information - Alternate source of details and stats.

Wooden roller coasters
Roller coasters operated by Cedar Fair
Roller coasters in Ohio
Roller coasters introduced in 1979